Enga Mohamed Sayed (انجي محمد, born ) was an Egyptian female weightlifter, competing in the 48 kg category and representing Egypt at international competitions. 

She participated at the 2004 Summer Olympics in the 48 kg event.

Major results

References

External links

1985 births
Living people
Egyptian female weightlifters
Weightlifters at the 2004 Summer Olympics
Olympic weightlifters of Egypt
Place of birth missing (living people)
21st-century Egyptian women